The Plea ( translit. Vedreba) is a 1967 Soviet art drama film directed by Tengiz Abuladze and co-written with Revaz Kveselava and Anzor Saluqvadze. The film based on the poems of Vazha-Pshavela. It regarded as an  influential classic and is an appreciated work of 20th century world cinema.

Plot
Aluda from Khevsureti had killed Mutsali in the combat, but he forgave him and did not cut off his right hand. Therefore Aluda was banished from his community... Jokola got acquainted with Zviadauri when he was hunting. He hosted him and he offered him to stay for the night, but Kists noticed their enemy, they took away Jokola's guest and killed him on the Kist's grave. Jokola as a host didn't manage to keep Zviadauri safe, so he couldn't take the abusing and got killed by the enemies.

Cast
Spartak Bagashvili Ghvtisia
Rusudan Kiknadze Woman
Ramaz Chkhikvadze Matsili
Otar Megvinetukhutsesi Jokola
Zurab Kapianidze Zviadauri
Nana Kavtaradze Agaza
Irakli Uchaneishvili Musa
Tengiz Archvadze Aluda
Geidar Palavandishvili Mutsali

Awards
San Remo International Film Festival - Grand Prize 1973

References

External links

Georgian-language films
1967 drama films
Films directed by Tengiz Abuladze
1960s avant-garde and experimental films
Soviet drama films
Soviet black-and-white films
Soviet avant-garde and experimental films
Drama films from Georgia (country)
Avant-garde and experimental films from Georgia (country)
Black-and-white films from Georgia (country)
Soviet-era films from Georgia (country)